Viktorija Andrulytė (born 16 April 1992) is Lithuanian yacht racer. She competes in Laser Radial class.

Biography 
In 2009 Andrulytė won silver in European junior championships. In 2010 Andrulytė participated in senior European championships where she finished 29th in Laser Radial class. In 2011 Andrulytė finished 15th at European Championships. In 2014 Andrulytė finished 10th in European championships. During 2014 ISAF Sailing World Championships she finished 22nd and secured qualification quota for Lithuania in 2016 Summer Olympics.

In 2013 Andrulytė was awarded Best Lithuanian Female Sailor of the Year title.

In 2021 Andrulytė finished 25th at the 2020 Summer Olympics.

References

External links 
 
 
 
 

1992 births
Living people
Lithuanian female sailors (sport)
Olympic sailors of Lithuania
Sailors at the 2020 Summer Olympics – Laser Radial